Phú Mỹ Hưng is a rural commune of Củ Chi District in Ho Chi Minh City, Vietnam.

The commune is the site of the Củ Chi tunnels and the Bến Dược Memorial Temple.

References

Populated places in Ho Chi Minh City